Tumu may refer to:

Tumu, Ghana, town in Ghana, upper west region.
Tumu, Libya, a checkpoint on the Libya–Niger border
Tumu Crisis, a frontier conflict between the Oirat Mongols and the Chinese Ming dynasty